"Sadeness (Part I)" is a song by German musical project Enigma, released in 1990 as the debut single from their first album, MCMXC a.D. (1990). It became an international hit, reaching number one in 14 countries. In the United States, the song peaked at number five on the Billboard Hot 100, and number one on both its Dance Club Songs and Dance Singles Sales charts. A sequel to the song, "Sadeness (Part II)" featuring Anggun, was released on Enigma's eighth studio album, The Fall of a Rebel Angel (2016).

History 
"Sadeness" was written by Michael Cretu (under the pseudonym Curly M.C.), Frank Peterson (under the pseudonym F. Gregorian), and Fabrice Cuitad (under the pseudonym David Fairstein). The song was named "Sadeness (Part I)" on its single release in Germany, and "Sadness Part I" on its single release in the United Kingdom and Japan.  It is a sensual track based around "questioning" the sexual desires of Marquis de Sade; hence the German release name of "Sadeness", as opposed to the English word of "Sadness" used in the UK release. The track reached number-one faster than any new release in German history - before its video clip had even been finished. The record company Virgin had done virtually no promotion on the song. Sales took off purely on the strength of radio and club play.

In the 2017 book Stars of 90's Dance Pop: 29 Hitmakers Discuss Their Careers by James Arena, producer Frank Peterson recalled: "Well, we finished the song, and we were in total awe of ourselves. Michael's manager, who also managed Sandra, came out to Ibiza with us for a weekend, and we played him the track. He was sitting there listening and said, "That's very heavy going. You'll never get that on radio." We started thinking, "Oh shit." An hour later, our contact at Virgin tells us his secretary and other people at the office are fucking amazed by the song. He said he didn't get it, but everyone else seemed to love it. So pretty quickly the song came out."

Music 
The track makes use of the following:
Gregorian vocals mostly sampled from the 1976 album Paschale Mysterium by the German choir Capella Antiqua München with conductor Konrad Ruhland. Particularly prominent is music from "Procedamus in pace!", an antiphon which is the second track on the album. The vocals were at first used without permission; a lawsuit followed in 1994 and was settled by compensation.
Part of the drum beat is sampled from James Brown's song Funky President (People It's Bad).
French lyrics whispered by Cretu's then-wife, Sandra, who at the time of Enigma's formation had already hit singles as a solo artist.

Critical reception

Ned Raggett from AllMusic commented, "Snippets of monks invoking the Almighty effortlessly glide in and out of a polite but still strong breakbeat, shimmering, atmospheric synth and flute lines and a Frenchwoman whispering in a way that sounds distinctly more carnal than spiritual (as her gasps for breath elsewhere make clear)." Keith Clark from Bay Area Reporter called the song "suggestive". Larry Flick from Billboard described it as "brilliant and quirky", remarking that "it is currently the fastest-selling single in German recording history." He added that it "has already raised the ire of religious groups for its use of traditional Gregorian chants within the context of orgasmic groaning and a tribal hip-hop groove." Complex included it in their 2013 list of "15 Songs That Gave Dance Music a Good Name", commenting, "We doubt that something like this, with lyrics in Latin and French that dealt with religion and the sexual desires of Marquis de Sade, would fly in today's pop charts, but there's something that was so undeniable about this new age/downtempo track that it was featured everywhere, from Single White Female to Tropic Thunder." Leah Greenblatt from Entertainment Weekly described it as a "incense trance". 

Irish Evening Herald called it "one of the most seductive dance records of the past couple of years". Swedish newspaper Expressen noted that church song are used "as a very reliable vocal generator". Dave Sholin from the Gavin Report wrote, "Listeners may not have a clue what it's about, but the mood created by this totally unique production will keep 'em glued and wanting more. Not only have the Germans demolished the Berlin Wall, they had the good sense to make this a number one "sod - as in (Marquis De Sade) ness." A reviewer from Music Week described it as "chanting monks and a sensual muttering rolling over a hypnotically rolling slow beat". Ian Cranna from Smash Hits noted the "atmospheric lines" of the song in his review, adding that it's "combining medieval monks' chants and wispy, wistful synthesiser driftings over hippety-hoppety beats." Bob Mack from Spin called it "the Dark Ages disco cut". He added that "the track starts with a standard call and response—but it's one of monks doing Gregorian chants. After the beats kick in, synth washes buoy the flute flourishes, while French spoken words and heavy female panting get the point across." Kimberly Chrisma from The Stanford Daily felt the result of combining Gregorian chant with "pulsating synthesizers" was "an ambient fantasia that made the heart throb and the mind tingle."

Chart performance
The single reached number-one on the UK Singles Chart on January 13, 1991, as well as in Austria, Belgium, France, Germany, Greece, Ireland, Italy, the Netherlands, Norway, Portugal, Spain, Sweden and Switzerland. It reached the top spot on the Eurochart Hot 100, where it remained at the top for nine weeks. In the United States, the single peaked at number five on the Billboard Hot 100 singles chart in April 1991. The record sold over 500,000 copies in the US and was certified Gold there. The single has sold more than 5 million copies worldwide. It earned a gold record in Australia, Austria, France, the Netherlands and the United States, and a silver record in the United Kingdom. It also earned a platinum record in Germany and Sweden.

Music video
The accompanying music video for "Sadeness (Part I)" was directed by Michel Guimbard, and received heavy rotation on MTV Europe. It shows a scribe who dreams of wandering among cathedral ruins. He comes up to Auguste Rodin's The Gates of Hell; and as the scribe looks on, he sees a woman (played by French model Cathy Tastet) beyond it, who whispers the main lyrics from the song to him. The scribe then opens the gates and, realising what he has done, attempts to flee, but is dragged through the gates. The video ends with the scribe waking up. "Sadeness (Part 1)" was later published by Vevo on YouTube in February 2009. In December 2022, the video had generated over 51 million views.

Track listings

 2-track 7-inch single for France
 "Sadeness Part I" (Radio Edit) – 4:17
 "Sadeness Part I" (Meditation Mix) – 2:57

 4-track 12-inch single for Europe
"Sadeness Part I" (Extended Trance Mix) – 4:57
"Sadeness Part I" (Meditation Mix) – 2:59
"Sadeness Part I" (Violent US Remix) – 4:57
"Sadeness Part I" (Radio Edit) – 4:14

 4-track CD single for the UK
 "Sadeness Part I" (Radio Edit) – 4:16
 "Sadeness Part I" (Extended Trance Mix) – 5:04
 "Sadeness Part I" (Meditation Mix) – 3:01
 "Sadeness Part I" (Violent US Remix) – 5:03

 5-track CD single for the US
 "Sadeness Part I" (Violent US Remix) – 5:03
 "Sadeness Part I" (Meditation Mix) – 3:01
 "Sadeness Part I" (Extended Trance Mix) – 5:04
 "Sadeness Part I" (Radio Edit) – 4:17
 "Introit: Benedicta sit sancta Trinitas" – 3:04

 2-track promotional CD single for Japan
 "Sadeness Part I" (Ebi-Kuma Mix) – 4:40
 "Sadeness Part I" (Meditation Mix)

Charts

Weekly charts

Year-end charts

Decade-end charts

Certifications

See also

List of number-one hits of 1990 (Austria)
List of number-one hits of 1990 (Germany)
List of number-one hits of 1990 (Switzerland)
List of Dutch Top 40 number-one singles of 1990
List of European number-one hits of 1991
List of number-one hits in Norway
List of Swedish number-one hits
List of number-one hits of 1991 (France)
List of number-one singles of 1991 (Ireland)
List of number-one singles from the 1990s (UK)
List of number-one dance singles of 1991 (U.S.)

References

1990 debut singles
1990 songs
Charisma Records singles
Dutch Top 40 number-one singles
EMI Records singles
Enigma (German band) songs
European Hot 100 Singles number-one singles
Irish Singles Chart number-one singles
Macaronic songs
Sampling controversies
Number-one singles in Austria
Number-one singles in Germany
Number-one singles in Greece
Number-one singles in Italy
Number-one singles in Norway
Number-one singles in Portugal
Number-one singles in Spain
Number-one singles in Sweden
Number-one singles in Switzerland
SNEP Top Singles number-one singles
Song recordings produced by Michael Cretu
Songs written by Michael Cretu
UK Singles Chart number-one singles
Ultratop 50 Singles (Flanders) number-one singles
Virgin Records singles
Works about the Marquis de Sade